The 1979 Pepsi Grand Slam, officially the  Pepsi-Cola Grand Slam of Tennis, was a men's tennis tournament played on outdoor green clay courts at the Mission Hills Country Club in Boca Raton, Florida, United States It was an Association of Tennis Professionals (ATP) sanctioned special event that was not part of the 1979 Colgate-Palmolive Grand Prix circuit. It was the fourth edition of the tournament and was held from February 10 through February 11, 1979.  Björn Borg won his third consecutive singles title at the event and earned $150,000 first prize money.

Final

Singles
 Björn Borg defeated  Jimmy Connors 6–2, 6–3
 It was Borg's 2nd singles title of the year and the 41st of his career.

Prize money

Draw

Third place match
 John McEnroe defeated  Guillermo Vilas 6–4, 6–2

See also
 Borg–Connors rivalry

References

External links
 ITF tournament edition details

Pepsi Grand Slam
Pepsi Grand Slam
Pepsi Grand Slam
Pepsi Grand Slam